Joseph McNally is the name of:

 Joseph McNally (brother) (1923–2002), Irish brother of the  De La Salle Brothers
 Joseph McNally (businessman) (1942–2012), British businessman